Bahram Parsaei (born 1971) is an reformist politician who is currently a member of the Parliament of Iran representing Shiraz electoral district. He was elected as a parliament member in the 2016 election with 197,471 votes. He is spokesperson of both Hope fraction and The Ninety Point Commission in the parliament. He was a former member of Shiraz's city council, being elected in 2013 local election, but was resigned on 15 June 2015 in favor of stand at the parliamentary election.

References

1971 births
Living people
People from Shiraz
Iranian businesspeople
Members of the 10th Islamic Consultative Assembly
Moderation and Development Party politicians
Iranian city councillors